In Greek mythology, Prothoenor (Ancient Greek: Προθοήνωρ) was one of the Greek leaders in the Trojan War, from Thespiae in Boeotia, son of Areilycus (Archilycus) and Theobule, brother of Arcesilaus; he commanded eight ships. In one account, Prothoenor was the son of Alector and Arteis, and thus a half-brother of Leitus and Clonius. According to the Iliad, he was killed by Polydamas, who immediately began to boast about it.

Notes

References 

 Diodorus Siculus, The Library of History translated by Charles Henry Oldfather. Twelve volumes. Loeb Classical Library. Cambridge, Massachusetts: Harvard University Press; London: William Heinemann, Ltd. 1989. Vol. 3. Books 4.59–8. Online version at Bill Thayer's Web Site
 Diodorus Siculus, Bibliotheca Historica. Vol 1-2. Immanel Bekker. Ludwig Dindorf. Friedrich Vogel. in aedibus B. G. Teubneri. Leipzig. 1888-1890. Greek text available at the Perseus Digital Library.
 Gaius Julius Hyginus, Fabulae from The Myths of Hyginus translated and edited by Mary Grant. University of Kansas Publications in Humanistic Studies. Online version at the Topos Text Project.
 Homer, The Iliad with an English Translation by A.T. Murray, Ph.D. in two volumes. Cambridge, MA., Harvard University Press; London, William Heinemann, Ltd. 1924. . Online version at the Perseus Digital Library.
 Homer, Homeri Opera in five volumes. Oxford, Oxford University Press. 1920. . Greek text available at the Perseus Digital Library.
 Tzetzes, John, Allegories of the Iliad translated by Goldwyn, Adam J. and Kokkini, Dimitra. Dumbarton Oaks Medieval Library, Harvard University Press, 2015. 

Achaean Leaders
Boeotian characters in Greek mythology